Cyril Farrell (born 1 August 1950) is an Irish former hurling manager, selector, trainer and coach. He was the manager of the senior Galway county team on three separate occasions, during which time he became the county's longest-serving manager and most successful in terms of major titles won.

After being involved in team management and coaching in all grades at club level with Tommy Larkin's, as well as with the Galway minor and under-21 teams, Farrell was appointed coach of the Galway senior team for the first time in 1979. As manager at various times over much of the following twenty years, he led Galway through a period of unprecedented national dominance, winning seven major honours. These include three All-Ireland Championships, including back-to-back titles in 1987 and 1988, two Connacht Championships and two National Hurling Leagues.

Farrell regularly appears as a hurling pundit on RTÉ's The Sunday Game.

He won a Fitzgibbon Cup with University College Galway in 1977.

Honours

Player
University College Galway
Fitzgibbon Cup (1): 1977

Tommy Larkin's
Connacht Senior Club Hurling Championship (1): 1971
Galway Senior Club Hurling Championship (1): 1971

Manager
Galway
All-Ireland Senior Hurling Championship (3): 1980, 1987, 1988
Connacht Senior Hurling Championship (2): 1997, 1998
National Hurling League (2): 1986-87, 1988-89
All-Ireland Under-21 Hurling Championship (2): 1978, 1996
All-Ireland Minor Hurling Championship (1): 1983

References

1950 births
Living people
Gaelic games players from County Galway
Gaelic games writers and broadcasters
Heads of schools in Ireland
Hurling managers
Hurling selectors
University of Galway hurlers
Tommy Larkin's hurlers